Meinongian argument is a type of ontological argument or an "a priori argument" that seeks to prove the existence of God. This is through an assertion that there is "a distinction between different categories of existence." The premise of the ontological argument is based on Alexius Meinong's works. Some scholars also associate it with St. Anselm's ontological argument.

Concept 

There are several ontological arguments that qualify as Meinongian but what all these have in common is the reliance upon the theory of objects defended by Alexius Meinong. This theory holds that: 1) there are properties; 2) this assumption does not exclude the possibility of nominalism; and, 3) the predicate expressions in natural language express properties. Out of these contexts, objects are specified or identified through an unordered collections of properties. The premises of Meinongian arguments, hence, cite a distinction of different categories of existence. This include the concept of impossible objects (e.g. round square, golden mountain) where knowledge can be gained and assert true claims out of things that do not exist. The argument implies, for instance, that: "it is now true that [Sherlock Holmes] did not exist at t0, there was a true proposition at t0, such as the present tensed proposition [Sherlock Holmes does not exist], and that proposition was made true at t0 by Sherlock Holmes' not instantiating existence".

Miroslaw Szatkowski cited St. Anselm's ideas to explain the concept of the Meinongian argument. There was the philosopher's theory that there are two modes of being (or of existence): a weaker (less demanding) existence; and, a stronger (more demanding) existence. In the Meinongian existence thesis, it is argued that even if the Fool is right to say that something than which nothing greater can be conceived does not exist in reality, it is still true to say that the same denotes a certain item, one that is weaker and less demanding mode of existence. These weak and strong modes of existence are not exclusive and that a thing can enjoy both. Szatkowski noted that thinkers such as St. Thomas Aquinas and Gaunilo of Marmoutiers believed that God falls within the weaker, less demanding existence since one cannot fully grasp the divine nature in its entirety and that we only understand a certain name of God. However, this partial grasp of the divine nature is enough to demonstrate the name "something a grater than which cannot be conceived". For Swatkowski, these interpretations presupposes an ontology that indicate Meinongian thought. 

Bertrand Russell described the Meinongian argument in the following statement:If you say that the golden mountain does not exist, it is obvious that there is something that you are saying that does not exist - namely the golden mountain; therefore the golden mountain must subsist in some shadowy Platonic realm of being, for otherwise your statement that the golden mountain does not exist would have no meaning.While some thinkers associate the Meinongian argument with Anslem's ontology, there are, however, noted differences. For instance, the Meinongian conceptualization treated existenz as one of the two modes of sein while Anselm treated it as a stylistic variant.

Incomplete objects 

Meinongian argument describes incomplete objects as that which never exists or has being in its own right, merely deriving its existence by being embedded in complete objects. This can be demonstrated when the properties of an incomplete object are present or shared by one or more existing complete objects. It is also explained that all actually existing objects are complete objects and that we can never conceive any such complete objects due to the finite capacities of the human mind. The Meinongian argument for incomplete object is said to be the key to the treatment of conception-dependence.

Reformulations 
To address some of the perceived weaknesses of the Meinongian argument, some thinkers proposed modifications. A reformulation, for example, suggested the elimination of the term proposition so that:

 If we can refer to an object, then we can make a statement about it at least meaningful;
 A statement about nothing is a meaningless statement;
 A statement is about something only if that object exists.;
 Therefore, we cannot refer to nonexistent objects.

Opposing Thoughts 

One of the critics that criticized Meinongian arguments was Willard Van Orman Quine, who attacked the ontological argument in his work, On What There Is. In this paper, Quine complained the Meinongian conceptualization of the individuation of non-existent objects. Bertrand Russell's ideas also undercut Meinongian argument. This was evident in his theory of denoting concepts, where he maintained that denoting concepts may fail to denote since there is no such thing as the purported denotation. For Russell, this makes it possible for the existence of nothing and a definite description to describe it. In The Existential Import of Propositions, he stated:"The present king of England" is a denoting concept denoting an individual; "The present king of France" is a similar complex concept denoting nothing.Russell, however, recognized that Meinongian argument is an unqualified form of direct realism.

References 

Arguments for the existence of God
Philosophy of religion